The Chaotic Wrestling Pan Optic Championship is a professional wrestling championship in Chaotic Wrestling. The inaugural champion was Nikki Roxx. The current champion is Paris Van Dale, who is in her second reign.

Title history 
Nikki Roxx was the inaugural champion. Alexxis/Alisha Edwards has the most reigns at three. Kasey Ray's first reign is the longest singular reign at 413 days, while Skylar's second reign is the shortest at 42 days.

Paris Van Dale is the current champion in her first reign. She defeated Armani Kayos on Pandemonium: Friday The 13th on January 13, 2023 in Lowell, MA.

Combined reigns 

See also 
 Chaotic Wrestling Heavyweight Championship
 Chaotic Wrestling New England Championship
 Chaotic Wrestling Tag Team Championship

References

External links 
 Chaotic Wrestling Pan Optic Title History at Cagematch.net

Chaotic Wrestling championships
Women's professional wrestling championships